Pershinskaya-2 is a rural locality (a village) in Verkhovskoye Rural Settlement, Tarnogsky District, Vologda Oblast, Russia. The population was 3 as of 2002.

Geography 
Pershinskaya-2 is located 40 km west of Tarnogsky Gorodok (the district's administrative centre) by road. Olikhovskaya is the nearest rural locality.

References 

Rural localities in Tarnogsky District